The Victoria Medal of Honour (VMH) is awarded to British horticulturists resident in the United Kingdom whom the Royal Horticultural Society Council considers deserving of special honour by the Society.

The award was established in 1897 "in perpetual remembrance of Her Majesty's glorious reign, and to enable the Council to confer honour on British horticulturists."  The Society's rules state that only sixty-three horticulturists can hold the VMH at any given time, in commemoration of the sixty-three years of Queen Victoria's reign.  Therefore, the honour is not awarded every year, but may be made to multiple recipients in other years.

Awards

1897 – The first 60 medallists
The first 60 medals were awarded on 26 October 1897:
John Gilbert Baker (1834–1920)
Isaac Bayley Balfour (1853–1922)
Peter Barr (1826–1909)
Archibald F Barron (1835–1903)
Edward John Beale (1835–1902)
William Boxall (1844–1910)
William Bull (1828–1902)
George Bunyard (1841–1919)
Frederick William Burbidge (1847–1905)
William Crump (1843–1932)
Richard Dean (1830–1905)
George A Dickson (c1835 – 1909)
Henry Honeywood D'ombrain (1818–1905)
Charles Thomas Druery (1843–1917)
Malcolm Dunn (1837–1899)
Henry Nicholson Ellacombe (1822–1916)
Henry John Elwes (1846–1922)
Michael Foster (1836–1907)
John Fraser (1821–1900)
Paul George (1841–1921)
George Gordon (1841–1914)
John Heal (c1841 – 1925)
George Henslow (1835–1925)
Hermann Carl Gottlieb Herbst (c1830 – 1904)
Samuel Reynolds Hole (1819–1904)
Joseph Dalton Hooker (1817–1911)
Francis Daltry Horner (c1838 – 1912)
James Hudson (1846–1932)
Gertrude Jekyll (1843–1932)
Peter Edmund Kay (1853–1909)
John Laing (1823–1900)
Charles Maries (1851–1902)
James McIndoe (1836–1910)
Henry Ernest Milner (1845–1906)
Edwin Molyneux (1851–1921)
George Monro (c1847 – 1920)
Fredrick William Moore (1857–1949)
Daniel Morris (1844–1933)
George Nicholson (1847–1908)
James O'Brien (1842–1930)
William Paul (1822–1905)
T Francis Rivers (1831–1899)
Lionel Walter Rothschild (1868–1937)
Frederick Sander (1847–1920)
Henry Schröder (1824–1910)
John Seden (1840–1921)
Nathaniel Newman Sherwood (1846–1916)
James Smith (1837–1903)
Martin Ridley Smith ( – 1908)
Walter Speed (c1835 – 1921) Head Gardener at Penrhyn Castle, Wales
Arthur Warwick Sutton (1854–1925)
Owen Thomas (1843–1923)
William Thompson (1823–1903)
David Thomson (1823–1909)
Harry Turner (c1848 – 1906)
Ellen Willmott (1858–1934)
George Fergusson Wilson (1822–1902)
Charles Wolley-Dod (1826–1904)
John Wright (1836–1916)
George Wythes (1851–1916)

1900–1909
1900
George Herbert Engleheart (1851–1936) breeder of daffodils
 Trevor Lawrence (1831–1913), President of the Royal Horticultural Society 1885 to 1913
1901
 George King (1840–1909)
 Eleanor Ormerod
 James Sweet, Messrs J. Sweet & Sons Ltd, nurserymen, Whetstone
1902
 Mordecai Cubitt Cooke (1825–1914), Mycologist
1903
Thomas Smith, Daisy Hill Nursery 
1904
 Edward Mawley (1842–1916)
1905
 Henry Eckford (1823–1905) 
1906
 Richard Irwin Lynch (1850–1924), Curator of the Cambridge University Botanic Garden
 Harry Veitch (1840–1924)

1910–1919
1911
Charles Robert Fielder (1857-1946 Bramshaw)
1912
Ernest Henry Wilson (1876–1930) 
1916
Edward Augustus Bowles (1865–1954)
1917
 William Jackson Bean (1863–1947)
 Frederick Chittenden (1873–1950), first Director of the RHS Wisley Garden.
 Sir Herbert Eustace Maxwell (1845–1937)
Peter Veitch (1850–1929)

1920–1929
1921
 George Forrest (1873–1932)
1922
 Arthur Boscawen (1862–1935)
1924
 Arthur Grove
1925 
 Samuel B. Dicks (1845–1926), seedsman
 William Rickatson Dykes (1827–1925)
 William Wright Smith (1875–1956)
 George Yeld (1845–1938)
1926
 Herbert George Alexander (orchid grower)
Frederick Vincent Theobald (1868–1930)
1927
 Frederick Robert Stephen Balfour (1873–1945)
1928
 W. Nelmes
1929
 Sir William Lawrence (1870–1934), Lionel de Rothschild (1882–1942)

1930–1939
1931
Laura McLaren, Baroness Aberconway (1854–1933)
1933
George Percival Baker (1856–1951)
Frederick William Millard (1864–1964)
1934
Henry McLaren, 2nd Baron Aberconway (1879–1953) 
1935
Amos Perry (1871–1953), of Perry's Plant Farm
1936
Stephenson Robert Clarke (1862–1948), of Borde Hill
James Comber (1866–1953), of Nymans, Handcross
 Frederick Augustus Secrett (1886–1964) 
1938
 William Fleming Bewley (1891–1976) 
 Frederick George Preston (1882–1964).
1939
Charles Percival Raffill M.B.E.(1876–1951), Curator, Kew Gardens. Raffill was also honoured in 1934 as an Associate of Honour of the Royal Horticultural Society (AHRHS).

1940–1949
 1940
 Sir Frederick Claude Stern (1884–1967) – Highdown chalk garden
 1941
 Edwin Lawrence Hillier – Hillier Nurseries 
 1942
 Lady Iris Lawrence 
 1944
 Arthur Dorrien-Smith (1876–1955)
 John Hutchinson (1884–1972) 
 1945
 Fred Streeter (1879–1975) – horticulturalist and broadcaster
 1946
 Vera Higgins (1892–1962) 
 1948
 Wilfrid Fox (1875–1962) –  Winkworth Arboretum
 1949
 Ernest Ballard (1870–1952)
 Harry Higgott Thomas (1876–1956) –  Editor of Popular Gardening

1950–1959
1951
Peter Crichton Kay (1889–1954)
1952
Albert Maurice Amsler (1877–1952)
 Collingwood Ingram (1880-1981)
 Thomas Wallace (1891–1965)
1953
Archibald Park Balfour
Sir David Bowes-Lyon (1902–1961)
C Edward Hudson
 1954
 Raymond Henry Stoughton (1903–1979)
1955
Robert L. Scarlett : for his contributions to horticultural experimental work in Scotland & United Kingdom.
 Lilian Snelling (1879–1972)
1957
 William MacDonald Campbell
 Harold Roy Fletcher(1907–1978), Keeper of the Royal Botanic Garden Edinburgh
 John Scott Lennox Gilmour (1906–1995)
 Harold Hillier (1905–1985) – Hillier Nurseries 
1958
Frank P. Knight (1903–1985), Director of Wisley Garden

1960–1969
1960
 Maurice Mason (1912–1993)
1961
 Sir Edward Bolitho of Trengwainton, Penzance
 Queen Elizabeth the Queen Mother (1900–2002) 
 William Gregor MacKenzie, curator of Chelsea Physic Garden
 Thomas Hope Findlay (1910-1994) Keeper of Gardens Windsor Great Park 1943-1975
Charles McLaren, 3rd Baron Aberconway (1913–2003)
1963
 S. Millar Gault 
 Sir James Horlick (1886–1972) of The Island of Gigha 
1964
 Gwendolyn Anley 
 Hans Hvass – Danish writer on natural history
1965
 John Paul Wellington Furse (1904–1978) 
 Beatrix Havergal (1901–1980) 
 William T. Stearn (1911–2001)
1967 
 Arthur Hellyer (1902–1993) – RHS. Horticultural writer and journalist.
 Sir Giles Rolls Loder, 3rd Baronet (1914–1999) of Leonardslee, Lower Beeding, Horsham
1968
 Graham Stuart Thomas (1909–2003)

1970–1979
1970
 Roy Hay (1910–1989)
 Alan F. Mitchell (1922–1995) 
1971
 Alan Bloom (1906–2005)
 Frances Perry (1907–1993)
 Patrick Synge (1910–1982)
1973
 Julia Clements
1974
 Roy Copeman Elliott  (Alpine gardener)
 Martin O. Slocock 
1975
 Henry Rawnsley Barr (1903–1987) 
 Valerie Finnis (1924–2006) 
1976
 Christopher D. Brickell 
 John Pilkington Hudson (1910–2007)
 Lady Marie Loder of Leonardslee, Lower Beeding, Horsham
1977
 Percy Thrower (1913–1988), Television gardener 
 Mrs Desmond Underwood
1978
 W Martin Robinson, vegetable expert.
1979
 Christopher Lloyd (1921–2006)

1980–1989
1980
Leonard Broadbent (1916–2002) – Professor in Biology at the University of Bath
Sheila Macqueen – Flower arranger
1981
John Bond (1932–2001) – Keeper of Windsor Great Park and the Savill Gardens
Sir John Heathcoat-Amory, 3rd Baronet (1894–1972)  and Lady Heathcoat-Amory (1901–1997)
1982
Adrian Frank Posnette
1983
John Stewart Mattock
1984
 Kath Dryden (−2009) – alpine plant expert
1985
 Adrian Bloom – Bressingham Steam and Gardens
 Douglas Mackay Henderson (1927–2007), Keeper, Royal Botanic Gardens Edinburgh
 Fred Whitsey (1919–2009)- Gardening correspondent of The Daily Telegraph
1986
 Lady Anne Berry (1919–)
 Robin A.E. Herbert (1934–)  Former President of RHS
 John B. Simmons  (1937–) 
1987
 W.L. Banks 
 Beth Chatto (1923–2018)
1988
 Roy Lancaster (1937–)
1989
 Carolyn Hardy (1930–2016)- Chairman, National Gardens Scheme 
 A.D. Schilling

1990–1999
1990
Sylvia Crowe(1901–1997) 
 D.J. Fuller 
1991 
 P. Cox 
 B. Mathew 
 Frederick Alkmund Roach (1909–2004) 
 Miriam Rothschild (1908–2005)
 D.J. Sales 
1993
 Alan Hardy (1926–1999) – Sandling Estate  
 Mary Shirville Newnes (1926–2020) – flower arranger 
 Charles Notcutt (1935–2015)
1994
 Sir Geoffrey Jellicoe (1900–1996) – Landscape Designer
 James Smart – of Marwood Hill Garden 
1995
 Raymond J Evison(1944–) 
 David McClintock (1913–2001) 
 Helen Robinson (1919–2004) – Hyde Hall  
1996
 John G. Hillier – Hillier Nurseries 
 Penelope Hobhouse (1929–) 
 C.R.M. Notcutt 
1997
 J.W. Blanchard 
 Mary Grierson (1912–2012) – Botanical artist 
 John Palmer, Earl of Selborne
1998
 Joyce Stewart (1936–2011) – Director of Horticulture, RHS  
Rosemary Verey (1918–2001) 
1999
 H. Moggridge 
 A. Moon 
 Sir Ghillean Tolmie Prance (1937–)
 G.H. Rae

2000–2009
2001
 P. Erskine 
2002
 David Austin (1926–2018) for his rose breeding
2003
 Peter Beales (1936–2013) for his rose breeding and media promotion of gardening
 Andrew Dunn for his pioneering of virus-free rootstock
 Peter Seabrook (1935–) for his rose breeding
2004
 Ray Bilton for his work with orchid hybrids
 David S. Ingram (1941–) for his pioneering research into plant diseases
 Alan Titchmarsh for his broadcasting and authorial gardening educational outreach
2005
 Martin Lane Fox for his work in landscape garden design
 Tony Lord for his work as a garden photographer and horticultural consultant
 Edmund Leopold de Rothschild for his work with rhododendron hybrids
 Tom Wood for his administrative work promoting horticulture
2006
 Jim Buttress, for his work as a garden show judge
 Sibylle Kreutzberger, for her work at Sissinghurst Castle in Kent
 Dr. Henry Oakeley, for his scientific work on orchids, the genera Lycaste, Ida and Anguloa
 Pamela Schwerdt, for her work at Sissinghurst Castle in Kent
2007
 Colin Ellis – "for his long and distinguished service since 1983 with RHS Council and numerous committees."
 Christopher Grey-Wilson – for "his many achievements as botanist, photographer, botanical explorer and author of many books and articles."
 Sir Richard Carew Pole (1938–) – former RHS President
 Brian Self – "for his lifetime of service to amateur and professional fruit growers."
2008
 John Ravenscroft – "for his plantsmanship, entrepreneurial talent and encyclopaedic knowledge of plants."
2009
 Charles Baring, 2nd Baron Howick of Glendale 
 Charles III - "for his passion for plants, sustainable gardening and the environment."
 John Humphris
 Lady Christine Skelmersdale

2010–present
2010
 Peter R. Dawson 
 Michael Hickson 
 Robert T. Hillier 
 John Massey – "for his valuable contribution to plantbreeding "
 Dowager Marchioness Salisbury 
2011
 Giles Coode-Adams 
 Maurice C. Foster 
 Richard Webb  
2012
Stephen Blackmore
Alice Boyd, Viscountess of Merton
David Clark
John Parker
2013
Nigel Colborn
Brian Humphrey
2014
Chris Sanders
2015 Not awarded
2016 
 Mark Flanagan (posthumously)
 Johan Hermans
2017 
Nick Dunn
Jekka McVicar – RH Vice-President
2018 
 Peter Catt 
 Carol Klein
 Charles Williams
2019
 Fergus Garrett
 Tony Kirkham
 Bill Simpson
2020
 Christopher Bailes
 Jim Gardiner
 Jim (James) McColl
2022
 Monty Don
Brian Duncan
Peter Thoday

See also

 List of agriculture awards

References

External links
 

British science and technology awards
Gardening in the United Kingdom
Royal Horticultural Society